Steinberg is a German musical software and equipment company.

Steinberg may also refer to:

 Steinberg (surname)

Companies
 Steinberg's (supermarket), defunct Canadian supermarket chain
 Steinberg's (electronics store), a defunct chain of electronics stores in the United States

Places

Austria 
 Steinberg am Rofan, in Tyrol
 Steinberg-Dörfl, in Burgenland
 Rohrbach-Steinberg in Steiermark

Germany 
 Steinberg am See, Schwandorf, Bavaria
 Steinberg, Saxony
 Steinberg, Schleswig-Holstein
 Steinberg, Kloster Eberbach, a wall-enclosed vineyard near Hattenheim
Mountains and hills
 Steinberg (Kaufungen Forest), Hesse
 Steinberg (Leine Uplands), Lower Saxony
 Steinberg (Lower Bavaria), Bavaria
 Steinberg (Swabian Jura), Baden-Württemberg
 Steinberg (Wittgendorf), Saxony

Norway
 Steinberg, Norway

See also 
 Floyd–Steinberg dithering, a dithering algorithm
 Steinberg group (disambiguation)
 Steinberg representation
 Steinberger, a brand of bass guitar
 Steinburg (disambiguation)
 Bergstein (disambiguation)